Gearhead is the name of two supervillains appearing in American comic books published by DC Comics.

Publication history 
The unidentified Gearhead first appeared in Steel #14.

The Nathan Finch version of Gearhead first appeared in Detective Comics #712 and was created by Chuck Dixon, Graham Nolan, and Bob McLeod.

Fictional character biographies

Unrevealed

The first Gearhead appeared as a henchman of the supervillain called White Rabbit.

Nathaniel Finch

The second Gearhead is Nathaniel Finch, a former engineer at General Robotics. While he was kidnapping and holding Gloria Osteen, his boss' daughter, for ransom, he ran afoul of Batman who rescued her, but Batman was not able to save Nathan from falling to a presumed icy death. Nathan Finch's body was discovered by two down-and-out people who take him to an underworld doctor named Dr. Bascomb. It turned out that Nathan was not dead and the doctor wanted Nathan's knowledge of cybernetics. Due to the ravages of frostbite, Dr. Bascomb was forced to remove his arms and legs and replaced them with cybernetic arms and legs. Following training with his cybernetic limbs, Nathan becomes Gearhead and develops his own cybernetic arsenal of removable body parts as well as a goal to exterminate Batman, whom he refers to as the "vermin". Gloria Osteen later received a call from Nathan to meet him at Babylon Towers. During the confrontation between the two of them, Batman arrived and fought Gearhead as they neared a grinder where Gearhead started to choke Batman. As Gearhead started to get Batman close to the grinder, Gloria decided to help Batman by activating a hydraulic magnet to get Gearhead off of Batman. With his legs removed, Finch still managed to get away with a Batarang still in his cybernetic arm. While enlisting the help of Robin, Batman traced Gearhead to the sewers where he found a batarang and no Gearhead. Just then, Gearhead attacked Batman. While chasing Gearhead, Batman figured out that his attack on Gloria was a cover so that he can have revenge on Batman. When they fell into the water, Batman broke off one of Gearhead's arms as Gearhead used his other arm to get away. While Batman left a note for Gloria complete with Gearhead's arm stating that Gearhead is not after her, Gearhead was seen at his hideout rebuilding his body and planning his revenge on Batman.

Later, as Batman stops three thieves, Gearhead watches from the rooftops where he remembers his origin. Later at his hideout, Gearhead watches a wildlife television show and gets an idea on how to defeat Batman. The next day, Gearhead attends the press release at Drexel Pharmaceuticals, which is about to debut chips that would bind to living tissue and help fight diseases faster. As the press thinks that Gearhead is a concerned citizen when he asked about the chips on anyone who is part human and part mechanical, this attracts the attention of Bruce Wayne and Alfred Pennyworth. Later that night, Gearhead begins his heist at Drexel Pharmaceuticals when Batman arrives. Upon luring Batman to the parking lot and recapping the "tools" that Dr. Bascomb gave him, Gearhead assembles a big car-like structure up to his waist which is directed by his arms. Batman enters the Batmobile and chases after Gearhead which is what Gearhead had wanted. In the empty part of Gotham City, Gearhead released a miniature car which disabled the Batmobile. After the Batmobile crashes into a pillar, Gearhead decides to let the local street punks deal with Batman. Gearhead then watches as the street punks close in on the crashed Batmobile. After Batman has recovered and gotten away from the street punks, Gearhead pursues Batman onto the freeway where bombs had been dropped by Batman, but which had no effect on it. When Batman spilled oil, it caused Gearhead to slip into a wall which damaged his wheels. This causes Gearhead to activate the spider-like legs on his vehicle. When Batman accelerated Gearhead enough to crash into a wall, it ejected Gearhead landing him on the railroad tracks. Even though it seemed that Gearhead was crushed by the train, Gearhead survived without his cybernetic legs as he crawls somewhere to plan revenge on Batman.

When Nicholas Scratch orders his henchmen to find someone to cause chaos in Gotham City, they introduced him to Gearhead, Dynamiteer, and Tumult. After Nightwing and Robin defeated Tumult, they were being watched by a vengeful Gearhead. As Nightwing and Robin patrol Gotham City, they are still being watched by Gearhead through a camera device and he is curious as to where Batman is. Upon pulling off an ambush, Gearhead took Nightwing captive and had Robin tell Batman that he has less than an hour to confront him or he will kill Nightwing. As Gearhead was starting to lose his patience while tying Nightwing to the soon-to-be-destroyed bridge, he hears Batman's voice which actually came from a voice modulator that Robin used to distract Gearhead while he freed Nightwing. After Nightwing and Robin escaped into the water, Gearhead was attacked by a mob of Nicholas Scratch's minions. As Gearhead shot at them, he accidentally also shot the detonators which destroyed the bridge and prevented the villains from leaving Gotham City.

Gearhead later played a part in the Robin section of the No Man's Land crossover, in which he is one of a number of villains competing for control of Gotham City's sewers. Without the use of his cybernetic arms and legs, he is forced into partnership with the thuggish Tommy Mangles who carries around Finch's torso. The two of them scared off any refugees they came across and stole their supplies. Their actions surprised a rat that worked for Ratcatcher. Gearhead and Tommy Mangles are later dragged underwater and find themselves in a different place from where they were before. The two of them get lost in the sewers. Gearhead and Tommy Mangles are still lost as they check the map to see where they are. They find blocks of ice floating in the water and Gearhead suggests they head back as he doesn't like the ice. Tommy Mangles didn't listen to Gearhead and they were both frozen in ice when it turns out that they are near Mr. Freeze's hideout. As Gearhead and Tommy Mangles are now captives of Mr. Freeze, Gearhead is instructed by Mr. Freeze to tell him something useful. Gearhead mentions the storage room with canned food and other products. Mr. Freeze then freezes Gearhead and leaves to go look for the storage room. After Detective Mackenzie Bock arrested Mr. Freeze and Ratcatcher upon Robin defeating them, the Gotham City Police Department found the frozen bodies of Gearhead and Tommy Mangles and took them into police custody.

He made an appearance in the comic mini-series Rush City, where he is physically attached to his car and allies with Arthur Bellingame. When Rush and Black Canary catch up to Anatol Arraza, Gearhead also arrives as well as an army of mercenaries and the DEO as it is discovered that Anatol has a ten-megaton bio-weapon surgically implanted inside of his stomach which is keyed to his body's metabolism and is set to detonate should Anatol ever fall asleep. Gearhead then pursues Rush and Black Canary. Rush unleashes small versions of his car, Sam, which unleashes an EMP that disables Gearhead. Gearhead revives and drives away. Gearhead catches up to Rush and Black Canary as he brings out metal drills and circular saws from the engine of his car to attack. Rush and Black Canary work together to disable Gearhead.

During the Infinite Crisis storyline, Gearhead became a member of Alexander Luthor Jr.'s Secret Society of Super Villains.

Powers and abilities
The Nathan Finch version of Gearhead has genius-level intellect. He also can design gadgets that would be of use to him.

In other media

 The Nathaniel Finch incarnation of Gearhead appears in The Batman, voiced by Will Friedle. This version is a criminal racer who uses advanced nanotechnology. Additionally, his right arm contains cords capable of transmitting a nanotech virus via shells that infect and upgrade vehicles that he can then remotely operate, his fingertips can extend into claws, and his right eye can automatically guide and maneuver his vehicle through obstacles for him. In the episode "RPM", he steals money from a charity race and outraces Batman, during which the latter loses control of and loses the Batmobile. After building an upgraded version and incorporating a counter-virus reverse-engineered from one of Gearhead's shells, Batman and Batgirl defeat and apprehend Gearhead. Gearhead also makes a minor appearance in the episode "Rumors" as one of several supervillains captured by the vigilante Rumor.
 Two action figures of Gearhead, referred to as "Metal Head" for legal reasons, were made for Mattel's The Batman toyline, one for the EXP sub-line and one for the Shadowtek sub-line.
 The Batman incarnation of Nathan Finch / Gearhead appears in The Batman Strikes! #36 and #39, in which it is revealed that he used to be an underground racing celebrity before being grievously injured in an accident that left him quadriplegic. With his career destroyed, he received cybernetic enhancements from an unknown benefactor and became Gearhead.

See also
 List of Batman family enemies

References

External links
 Gearhead (Nathan Finch) at DC Comics Wiki
 Gearhead (Nathan Finch) at Comic Vine
 

Characters created by Chuck Dixon
Characters created by Bob McLeod
Characters created by Graham Nolan
Comics characters introduced in 1995
Comics characters introduced in 1997
Cyborg supervillains
DC Comics characters with superhuman strength
DC Comics cyborgs
Fictional engineers
Fictional racing drivers
Batman characters